John Plankenhorn aka Rob Plankenhorn (born August 20, 1954) is an American sprint canoer who competed in the mid-1980s. At the 1984 Summer Olympics in Los Angeles, he competed in the C-2 1000 m event and in the C-1 500 m event.

References
Sports-Reference.com profile

1954 births
American male canoeists
Canoeists at the 1984 Summer Olympics
Living people
Olympic canoeists of the United States